The FA of Wales Women's Challenge Cup, better known as the Welsh Women's Cup is the national women's football cup competition for Wales. It is run by the Football Association of Wales.

As Wales had no national league for women until the establishment of the Welsh Premier League in the 2009–10 season the Welsh Cup was the only ticket to the Women's Champions League. Unlike in the men's game, however, English-oriented clubs are allowed to participate. Cardiff City Ladies won eight consecutive cups from 2003 to 2010.

Possible reform

Following a number of high scoring, one sided matches in the opening round of the 2012–13 competition, the league's unofficial website called on the FAW to consider revamping the competition to avoid such embarrassing results in future seasons and encourage greater lower league participation.

Winners
The list of finals:

References

External links
faw.org.uk
welshpremier.com

 
Football cup competitions in Wales
Wales
Women's football in Wales
Recurring sporting events established in 1992
1992 establishments in Wales